This is a list of alternative R&B artists. Alternative R&B (also known as PBR&B) fuses traditional R&B with other musical elements such as rock, hip hop, EDM, dream pop, cloud rap, progressive soul, soul, jazz, chillwave, electro hop, trap, electropop, funk, trip hop and future garage. The subgenre rose to prominence in the late 2000s and eventually became a popular genre into the 2010s.

Artists

 070 Shake
 6lack
 Aaliyah
 Abra
 Jhené Aiko
 AlunaGeorge
 Anders
 Omar Apollo
 Autre Ne Veut
 Erykah Badu
 Banks
 Blackbear
 Blood Orange
 Jesse Boykins III
 Alessia Cara
 Alex Clare
 D'Angelo
 Daley
 Dean
 Dvsn
 Francis and the Lights
 Gallant
 Jack Garratt
 Groove Theory
 Sinéad Harnett
 H.E.R.
 How to Dress Well
 The Internet
 Ro James
 JMSN
 Kehlani
 Kelela
 Kelis
 Kenna
 Khalid
 Kiiara
 Kilo Kish
 King
 Steve Lacy
 Tory Lanez
 Jessy Lanza
 Ari Lennox
 Lion Babe
 Little Dragon
 Rosie Lowe
 Majid Jordan
 Marian Hill
 Mateo
 Maxwell
 Miguel
 Rainy Milo
 Janelle Monáe
 Nick Murphy
 Nao
 Frank Ocean
 Oh Wonder
 Anderson Paak
 PartyNextDoor
 Jai Paul
 Raury
 Allan Rayman
 Rhye
 Dawn Richard
 Sampha
 Thee Satisfaction
 Sevdaliza
 Seinabo Sey
 Shy Girls
 Jorja Smith
 Solange
 Spooky Black
 SZA
 Tei Shi
 THEY.
 Bryson Tiller
 Tinashe
 Samantha Urbani
 The Weeknd
 Wet
 Anna Wise
 Zayn

References

Alternative RandB